The Boy Who Drank Too Much is a 1980 American made-for-television drama film based on a novel by Shep Greene. The film was initially broadcast on CBS and sponsored by Xerox, and starred Scott Baio as a high school hockey player struggling with alcoholism. While its approach is that of a typical after school special, the film was presented as a prime time made-for-TV movie, which was seen February 6, 1980 at 9:00 pm ET/PT. Taking a form of a 20th-century morality play, the film dealt with a serious issue of alcoholism, that might confront youth in a prescriptive manner.

Plot
Baio stars as Buff Saunders, a teen hockey player well-liked and respected among his coaches and teammates. He battles to hide the truth from his elders and peers that, like his father, he is an alcoholic. He struggles to remain clean and sober in order not to lose his position on the team and the respect of his friends.

Cast
Scott Baio.....Buff Saunders
Lance Kerwin.....Billy Carpenter
Ed Lauter.....Gus Carpenter
Mariclare Costello.....Louis Carpenter
Stephen Davies.....Alan
Toni Kalem.....Tina
Katherine Pass.....Donna Watson
Dan Shor.....Art 'Artie' Collins
Michele Tobin.....Julie
Don Murray.....Ken Saunders
The Madison Pergolders [hockey team]
Brian Borgrud

Production
Filming for the movie took place in Los Angeles, California and Madison, Wisconsin.

Home Media 
MTM Home Video released the film on VHS in 1993 as a part of the "MTM Home Video Movie Collection."

References

External links

The Boy Who Drank Too Much at Internet Archive

1980s English-language films
1980 television films
1980 films
1980 drama films
Films about alcoholism
Films about dysfunctional families
Films shot in Wisconsin
Films shot in Los Angeles
CBS network films
Films scored by Michael Small
MTM Enterprises films
Films directed by Jerrold Freedman